The Santhià–Biella railway is a regional railway line of Piedmont in Italy, that connects Biella to Santhià railway node for Torino.

History 
The railway was inaugurated from 8 September 1856.

Since 10 July 1951, with the end of the concession to the "Società Strade Ferrate di Biella (SFB)" company, the management of the railway line passed to the state and the exercise was assumed by Ferrovie dello Stato.

In the year 2000, the entire line management passed to Rete Ferroviaria Italiana.

See also 
 List of railway lines in Italy

References

Footnotes

Sources
 
 

Railway lines in Piedmont
Railway lines opened in 1856